The Hawthorne effect is a type of reactivity in which individuals modify an aspect of their behavior in response to their awareness of being observed. The effect was discovered in the context of research conducted at the Hawthorne Western Electric plant; however, some scholars feel the descriptions are apocryphal.  

The original research involved workers who made electrical relays at the Hawthorne Works, a Western Electric plant in Cicero, Illinois. Between 1924 and 1927, the lighting study was conducted. Workers experienced a series of lighting changes in which productivity was said to increase with almost any change in the lighting. This turned out not to be true. In the study that was associated with Elton Mayo, which ran from 1928 to 1932, a series of changes in work structure were implemented (e.g., changes in rest periods) in a group of five women. However, this was a methodologically poor, uncontrolled study that did not permit any firm conclusions to be drawn. 

One of the later interpretations by Landsberger suggested that the novelty of being research subjects and the increased attention from such could lead to temporary increases in workers' productivity. This interpretation was dubbed "the Hawthorne effect".

History 
 
The term "Hawthorne effect" was coined in 1958 by Henry A. Landsberger when he was analyzing the Hawthorne studies conducted between 1924 and 1932 at the Hawthorne Works (a Western Electric factory in Cicero, outside Chicago). The Hawthorne Works had commissioned a study to determine if its workers would become more productive in higher or lower levels of light. The workers' productivity seemed to improve when changes were made, and slumped when the study ended. It was suggested that the productivity gain occurred as a result of the motivational effect on the workers of the interest being shown in them.

This effect was observed for minute increases in illumination. In these lighting studies, light intensity was altered to examine its effect on worker productivity. Most industrial or occupational psychology and organizational behavior textbooks refer to the illumination studies when discussing the Hawthorne effect. Only occasionally are the rest of the studies mentioned.

Although illumination research of workplace lighting formed the basis of the Hawthorne effect, other changes such as maintaining clean work stations, clearing floors of obstacles, and even relocating workstations resulted in increased productivity for short periods. Thus the term is used to identify any type of short-lived increase in productivity.

Relay assembly experiments 
In one of the studies, researchers chose two women as test subjects and asked them to choose four other workers to join the test group. Together the women worked in a separate room over the course of five years (1927–1932) assembling telephone relays.

Output was measured mechanically by counting how many finished relays each worker dropped down a chute. This measuring began in secret two weeks before moving the women to an experiment room and continued throughout the study. In the experiment room they had a supervisor who discussed changes with their productivity. Some of the variables were:

 Giving two 5-minute breaks (after a discussion with them on the best length of time), and then changing to two 10-minute breaks (not their preference). Productivity increased, but when they received six 5-minute rests, they disliked it and reduced output.
 Providing food during the breaks.
 Shortening the day by 30 minutes (output went up); shortening it more (output per hour went up, but overall output decreased); returning to the first condition (where output peaked).

Changing a variable usually increased productivity, even if the variable was just a change back to the original condition. However, it is said that this is the natural process of the human being adapting to the environment, without knowing the objective of the experiment occurring. Researchers concluded that the workers worked harder because they thought that they were being monitored individually.

Researchers hypothesized that choosing one's own coworkers, working as a group, being treated as special (as evidenced by working in a separate room), and having a sympathetic supervisor were the real reasons for the productivity increase. One interpretation, mainly due to Elton Mayo, was that "the six individuals became a team and the team gave itself wholeheartedly and spontaneously to cooperation in the experiment." (There was a second relay assembly test room study whose results were not as significant as the first experiment.)

Bank wiring room experiments 
The purpose of the next study was to find out how payment incentives would affect productivity. The surprising result was that productivity actually decreased. Workers apparently had become suspicious that their productivity may have been boosted to justify firing some of the workers later on. The study was conducted by Elton Mayo and W. Lloyd Warner between 1931 and 1932 on a group of fourteen men who put together telephone switching equipment. The researchers found that although the workers were paid according to individual productivity, productivity decreased because the men were afraid that the company would lower the base rate. Detailed observation of the men revealed the existence of informal groups or "cliques" within the formal groups. These cliques developed informal rules of behavior as well as mechanisms to enforce them. The cliques served to control group members and to manage bosses; when bosses asked questions, clique members gave the same responses, even if they were untrue. These results show that workers were more responsive to the social force of their peer groups than to the control and incentives of management.

Interpretation and criticism 
Richard Nisbett has described the Hawthorne effect as "a glorified anecdote," saying that "once you have got the anecdote, you can throw away the data." Other researchers have attempted to explain the effects with various interpretations. J. G. Adair warned of gross factual inaccuracy in most secondary publications on the Hawthorne effect and that many studies failed to find it. He argued that it should be viewed as a variant of Orne's (1973) experimental demand effect. For Adair, the Hawthorne effect depended on the participants' interpretation of the situation. An implication is that manipulation checks are important in social sciences experiments. He advanced the view that awareness of being observed was not the source of the effect, but participants' interpretation of the situation is critical. How did the participants' interpretation of the situation interact with the participants' goals? 

Possible explanations for the Hawthorne effect include the impact of feedback and motivation towards the experimenter. Receiving feedback on their performance may improve their skills when an experiment provides this feedback for the first time. Research on the demand effect also suggests that people may be motivated to please the experimenter, at least if it does not conflict with any other motive. They may also be suspicious of the purpose of the experimenter. Therefore, Hawthorne effect may only occur when there is usable feedback or a change in motivation.

Parsons defined the Hawthorne effect as "the confounding that occurs if experimenters fail to realize how the consequences of subjects' performance affect what subjects do" [i.e. learning effects, both permanent skill improvement and feedback-enabled adjustments to suit current goals]. His key argument was that in the studies where workers dropped their finished goods down chutes, the participants had access to the counters of their work rate.

Mayo contended that the effect was due to the workers reacting to the sympathy and interest of the observers. He did discuss the study as demonstrating an experimenter effect but as a management effect: how management can make workers perform differently because they feel differently. He suggested that much of the Hawthorne effect concerned the workers feeling free and in control as a group rather than as being supervised. The experimental manipulations were important in convincing the workers to feel this way, that conditions in the special five-person work group was really different from the conditions on the shop floor. The study was repeated with similar effects on mica-splitting workers.

Clark and Sugrue in a review of educational research reported that uncontrolled novelty effects cause on average 30% of a standard deviation (SD) rise (i.e. 50–63% score rise), with the rise decaying to a much smaller effect after 8 weeks. In more detail: 50% of a SD for up to 4 weeks; 30% of SD for 5–8 weeks; and 20% of SD for > 8 weeks, (which is < 1% of the variance).

Harry Braverman pointed out that the Hawthorne tests were based on industrial psychology and the researchers involved were investigating whether workers' performance could be predicted by pre-hire testing. The Hawthorne study showed "that the performance of workers had little relation to their ability and in fact often bore an inverse relation to test scores...". Braverman argued that the studies really showed that the workplace was not "a system of bureaucratic formal organisation on the Weberian model, nor a system of informal group relations, as in the interpretation of Mayo and his followers but rather a system of power, of class antagonisms". This discovery was a blow to those hoping to apply the behavioral sciences to manipulate workers in the interest of management.

The economists Steven Levitt and John A. List long pursued without success a search for the base data of the original illumination experiments (they were not true experiments but some authors labeled them experiments), before finding it in a microfilm at the University of Wisconsin in Milwaukee in 2011. Re-analysing it, they found slight evidence for the Hawthorne effect over the long-run, but in no way as drastic as suggested initially. This finding supported the analysis of an article by S R G Jones in 1992 examining the relay experiments. Despite the absence of evidence for the Hawthorne effect in the original study, List has said that he remains confident that the effect is genuine.

Gustav Wickström and Tom Bendix (2000) argue that the supposed "Hawthorne effect" is actually ambiguous and disputable, and instead recommend that to evaluate intervention effectiveness, researchers should introduce specific psychological and social variables that may have affected the outcome.

It is also possible that the illumination experiments can be explained by a longitudinal learning effect. Parsons has declined to analyse the illumination experiments, on the grounds that they have not been properly published and so he cannot get at details, whereas he had extensive personal communication with Roethlisberger and Dickson.

Evaluation of the Hawthorne effect continues in the present day. Despite the criticisms, however, the phenomenon is often taken into account when designing studies and their conclusions. Some have also developed ways to avoid it. For instance, there is the case of holding the observation when conducting a field study from a distance, from behind a barrier such as a two-way mirror or using an unobtrusive measure.

Greenwood, Bolton, and Greenwood (1983) interviewed some of the participants in the experiments and found that the participants were paid significantly better.

Trial effect
Various medical scientists have studied possible trial effect (clinical trial effect) in clinical trials. Some postulate that, beyond just attention and observation, there may be other factors involved, such as slightly better care; slightly better compliance/adherence; and selection bias. The latter may have several mechanisms: (1) Physicians may tend to recruit patients who seem to have better adherence potential and lesser likelihood of future loss to follow-up. (2) The inclusion/exclusion criteria of trials often exclude at least some comorbidities; although this is often necessary to prevent confounding, it also means that trials may tend to work with healthier patient subpopulations.

Secondary observer effect 

Despite the observer effect as popularized in the Hawthorne experiments being perhaps falsely identified (see above discussion), the popularity and plausibility of the observer effect in theory has led researchers to postulate that this effect could take place at a second level. Thus it has been proposed that there is a secondary observer effect when researchers working with secondary data such as survey data or various indicators may impact the results of their scientific research. Rather than having an effect on the subjects (as with the primary observer effect), the researchers likely have their own idiosyncrasies that influence how they handle the data and even what data they obtain from secondary sources. For one, the researchers may choose seemingly innocuous steps in their statistical analyses that end up causing significantly different results using the same data; e.g., weighting strategies, factor analytic techniques, or choice of estimation. In addition, researchers may use software packages that have different default settings that lead to small but significant fluctuations. Finally, the data that researchers use may not be identical, even though it seems so. For example, the OECD collects and distributes various socio-economic data; however, these data change over time such that a researcher who downloads the Australian GDP data for the year 2000 may have slightly different values than a researcher who downloads the same Australian GDP 2000 data a few years later. The idea of the secondary observer effect was floated by Nate Breznau in a thus far relatively obscure paper.

Although little attention has been paid to this phenomenon, the scientific implications are very large. Evidence of this effect may be seen in recent studies that assign a particular problem to a number of researchers or research teams who then work independently using the same data to try and find a solution. This is a process called crowdsourcing data analysis and was used in a groundbreaking study by Silberzahn, Rafael, Eric Uhlmann, Dan Martin and Brian Nosek et al. (2015) about red cards and player race in football (i.e., soccer).

See also 

 Barnum effect
 Demand characteristics
 Goodhart's law
 John Henry effect
 Mass surveillance
 Novelty effect
 Panopticism
 Placebo effect
 Pygmalion effect
 Quantum Zeno effect
 Reflexivity (social theory)
 Self-determination theory
 Social facilitation
 Stereotype threat
 Subject-expectancy effect
 Watching-eye effect

References

 Ciment, Shoshy. “Costco Is Offering an Additional $2 an Hour to Its Hourly Employees across the US as the Coronavirus Outbreak Causes Massive Shopping Surges.” Business Insider, Business Insider, 23 Mar. 2020, www.businessinsider.com/costco-pays-workers-2-dollars-an-hour-more-coronavirus-2020-3.
 Miller, Katherine, and Joshua Barbour. Organizational Communication: Approaches and Processes 7th Edition. Cengage Learning, 2014.

External links 

Evan Davis on the Hawthorne Effect, OpenLearn from The Open University
The Hawthorne, Pygmalion, placebo and other expectancy effects: some notes, by Stephen W. Draper, Department of Psychology, University of Glasgow.
BBC Radio 4: Mind Changers: The Hawthorne Effect
Harvard Business School and the Hawthorne Experiments (1924–1933), Harvard Business School.

Industrial and organizational psychology
Social phenomena
1932 in science
Cognitive biases
Observational study
Human behavior
1950s neologisms